South Union is an unincorporated community and census-designated place (CDP) in Oconee County, South Carolina, United States. It was first listed as a CDP prior to the 2020 census with a population of 341.

The CDP is in southern Oconee County, bordered to the southwest by the Chickasaw Point CDP. South Carolina Highway 11, the Cherokee Foothills Scenic Highway, runs through South Union, leading south  to South Carolina Exit 1 on Interstate 85. To the north the highway provides access to Westminster,  to the northwest, and Seneca,  to the northeast. South Carolina Highway 182 runs through the east side of South Union, leading southeast  to Fair Play and northeast  to South Carolina Highway 24 at Oakway.

Demographics

2020 census

Note: the US Census treats Hispanic/Latino as an ethnic category. This table excludes Latinos from the racial categories and assigns them to a separate category. Hispanics/Latinos can be of any race.

References 

Census-designated places in Oconee County, South Carolina
Census-designated places in South Carolina